Silver Spring or Silver Springs may refer to:

Places

Canada
 Silver Springs, Calgary, a neighborhood of Calgary, Alberta, Canada
Silver Springs Public School, a school in Toronto, Ontario, Canada
 Silver Spring, Conception Harbour, Newfoundland and Labrador, Canada
 Silverspring, Saskatoon, a neighborhood in Saskatoon, Saskatchewan

United States
Florida
 Silver Springs (attraction), a group of artesian springs in Marion County
 Silver Springs, Florida, an unincorporated community in Marion County
 Silver Springs Shores, Florida, a census-designated place in Marion County
 Silver Springs State Park, a Florida State Park including the attraction

Maryland
 Silver Spring, Maryland
Nevada
 Silver Springs, Nevada
 Silver Springs Airport, a public use airport southwest of Silver Springs
Other
 Silver Springs, Alaska
 Silver Springs, Missouri
 Silver Springs, New York
 Silver Spring, Pennsylvania
 Silver Springs State Fish and Wildlife Area, a park in Illinois

Companies
 Silver Spring Mineral Water Company Limited
 Silver Spring Networks

Transportation
 Silver Spring station (Maryland), a subway and commuter rail station in Silver Spring, Maryland
 Silver Spring station (Baltimore and Ohio Railroad), a historic train station in Silver Spring, Maryland

Other uses
Silver Spring, composition by William Mason (composer)
 "Silver Springs" (song), a song by Fleetwood Mac
 Silver Spring monkeys

See also
 Sandy Springs